132524 APL, provisional designation , is a small background asteroid in the intermediate asteroid belt. It was discovered by Lincoln Near-Earth Asteroid Research in May 2002, and imaged by the New Horizons space probe on its flyby in June 2006, when it was passing through the asteroid belt.

Discovery and classification 

APL was discovered on 9 May 2002 by astronomers of the Lincoln Near-Earth Asteroid Research at the Lincoln Laboratory Experimental Test Site near Socorro, New Mexico, United States. It is a non-family asteroid from the main belt's background population, and orbits the Sun in the central asteroid belt at a distance of  once every 4 years and 2 months (1,534 days; semi-major axis of ).

Naming 

Alan Stern, principal investigator for New Horizons, named the asteroid in reference to the Johns Hopkins University Applied Physics Laboratory (APL), which developed the New Horizons, NEAR Shoemaker and MESSENGER missions. The official naming citation was published by the Minor Planet Center on 6 January 2007.

New Horizons fly by 

The flyby was incidental, and not all the instruments were online at this time; they were still being activated after the spacecraft's launch on January 19, 2006. This is why the spacecraft's reconnaissance imager and highest magnification telescope were not online yet at the time of the flyby.

Ralph instrument 

APL was imaged with the 75-millimeter Ralph telescope, but not with the designed reconnaissance imager Long Range Reconnaissance Imager (LORRI) because it was not turned on yet. LORRI was not activated until 29 August 2006 when its cover was opened and its first light image would be Messier 7. It was, in general, possible to capitalize on the target of opportunity, and the asteroid was tracked for several days in June 2006 in addition to the other tests. In March, New Horizons had passed the orbit of Mars, and the spacecraft was undergoing various course correction maneuvers and tests throughout this time; as mentioned LORRI was not activated for another couple months. New Horizons passed through the asteroid belt during the summer of 2006, and the test helped prepare the team and spacecraft for the future flybys of Jupiter and Pluto.

Traversing the asteroid belt 

This was established in the early 1970s when Pioneer 10 and Pioneer 11 traversed the belt for the first time. There is some increased probability of encountering dust, but otherwise it takes special planning to actually pass very close to an asteroid, as was done with Galileo. In the 1990s, when it passed through the belt on its way to its second Earth gravity assist, it flew by 951 Gaspra; after the flyby en route to Jupiter, it flew by 243 Ida and discovered its moon Dactyl.

Physical characteristics 

Prior and in support of the New Horizons fly by on 13 June 2006, astronomers at European Southern Observatory's Paranal Observatory were observing APL with one of the four 8.2-meter Very Large Telescopes (UT1, Antu) between 25 May and 2 June 2006. The astronomers found that APL has a spectral type of a common, stony S-type asteroid.

See also 
 List of New Horizons topics

References

Further reading

External links 
 Discovery Circumstances: Numbered Minor Planets
 
 

132524
132524
Named minor planets
New Horizons
132524
20060613
20020509